Svappavaara (Meänkieli: Vaskivuori) is a locality situated in Kiruna Municipality, Norrbotten County, Sweden with 417 inhabitants in 2010. It is a mining village. Mining was started around 1650. Large scale iron mining started in 1965. The mine was closed in 1983, but enrichment of iron ore from the mine at Kiruna is still going on. The mine is owned by LKAB, and there is an ongoing project to open it again for production around year 2015.

The designers of Fermont, Quebec in northern Canada were inspired by Svappavaara and similar Swedish towns with regard to the windbreak building. In 2010, a portion of Ralph Erskine's windbreak building, "Ormen Långe" was demolished.

The iron-apatite ore of the Svappavaara mine is hosted in igneous rocks known as the Kiruna Porphyry.

References 

Populated places in Kiruna Municipality
Lapland (Sweden)
Populated places in Arctic Sweden